Basilica of St. Michael the Archangel may refer to:

 Basilica of St. Michael, Mondsee, Austria
 St. Michael's Basilica (Miramichi, New Brunswick)
 Basilica of St. Michael, Bordeaux, France
 Basilica of St Michael the Archangel, or Tayabas Basilica, Philippines
 Basílica pontificia de San Miguel, Madrid, Spain
 Basilica of St. Michael the Archangel (Loretto, Pennsylvania) , US
 Basilica of St. Michael the Archangel (Pensacola, Florida), US